Sangan-e Pain may refer to:

Sangan, Razavi Khorasan
Sangan, South Khorasan
Sangan, Tehran
Sangan-e Sofla, Qazvin